often called , is a Japanese idol, singer and actress. She is a member of the Japanese girl group 9nine.

Filmography

Musical 
 Macross The Musicalture (October 3–8, 2012)

TV drama 
 Hao-Hao! Kyonshi Girl (TV Tokyo, October 12 - December 21, 2012)

Discography

With 9nine

External links
 Agency profile 
 Official blog 

1993 births
Living people
Actresses from Osaka Prefecture
Musicians from Osaka Prefecture
Japanese idols
21st-century Japanese actresses
Japanese television actresses
21st-century Japanese singers
21st-century Japanese women singers